Mutio may refer to:

 Mutio Baroni, husband of Adriana Basile and Leonora Baroni
 Mutio Vitelleschi, the 6th Superior General of the Society of Jesus
 Mutio Scevola, an opera by the Italian composer Francesco Cavalli
 Mutio, a character on the anime Blue Submarine No. 6